Skidz is a skateboarding and BMX themed sports video game developed by Core Design for the Amiga and Atari ST. It was released in 1990 and published by Gremlin Graphics.

References

1990 video games
Amiga games
Atari ST games
Gremlin Interactive games
Core Design games
Sports video games
Video games developed in the United Kingdom